The Grossglockner High Alpine Road (in German Großglockner Hochalpenstraße) is the highest surfaced mountain pass road in Austria. The road is named after the Grossglockner, Austria's highest mountain. Built as a scenic route, a toll is assessed for passage.

Course

The popular overlook was named after a visit by Emperor Franz Joseph I of Austria and his consort Elisabeth in 1856. It offers a panoramic view over the Pasterze Glacier, the Grossglockner massif, the Glocknerwand, and the Johannisberg in the northwest. From here the road runs downhill to the southern toll booth near Heiligenblut.

History

Austria had suffered from the catastrophic economic results of losing the First World War, had shrunk to a seventh of its imperial size, lost its international markets and suffered devastating inflation.

Even the modest design of a  gravel road, with overtaking points, appeared too expensive. The impulse for building a road, which was meant to open up the barren alpine valleys to motorized tourism, was given by the New York stock market slump in 1929. This catastrophe shook an impoverished Austria with terrible force.

Within three years, the economic output dropped by a quarter, and unemployment rate reached 26%. The government then revived the Grossglockner project to give work to 3,200 (from an average of 520,000 jobless). The State advanced the building costs, and the users were to pay off this sum with a toll fee for usage.

On 30 August 1930 at 9:30am, the first explosives roared in Ferleiten. Four years later, the moving force of the road building, the Salzburg provincial head of government Franz Rehrl, and the technician Franz Wallack climbed into their Steyr 100 car, and achieved the first alpine crossing in an automobile on a graded road.

A year later, on 3 August 1935, the Grossglockner High Alpine Road was opened and put into full service a day later with an international automobile and motorcycle race.

Including the building of the access roads, the Glockner Road cost Austrian Schilling 910 million (at 1990 rates), around seven million less than estimated.

Planners had reckoned with 120,000 visitors in 1930, but the road's attraction for tourists in 1938 brought 375,000 visitors in 98,000 vehicles. After the Second World War it took until 1952 before the pre-war record was surpassed with 412,000 visitors and 91,000 vehicles. In 1962, 360,000 vehicles and 1.3 million visitors crossed the pass.

The Glockner Road also reflects the material advance of the people: in the early years, the motorcycle - as the poor man's car - accounted for up to a quarter of the traffic; 1955 was the highpoint with 47,500 motorcycles (26% of the traffic); in 1968, only 2,071 motorcycles were to be counted. The number of motorcycles on the Grossglockner High Alpine Road then rose by 2003 to over 76,000.

Snow clearing
In the years 1936 and 1937, 350 men shovelled  of snow in an average of seventy days to keep at least one lane on the road free. Since 1953, the five Wallack rotary plows, and twelve GROHAG workers, have been clearing  of snow from the road and parking areas in around fourteen days every year in April.

In 1937, the road could only be traversed for 132 days, but in 1963 the road could be traversed for 276 days. The Grossglockner High Alpine Road is normally open from the beginning of May to the end of October.

Giro d'Italia 
Grossglockner has been featured in the men's Giro d'Italia twice so far. The first time was in the 17th stage of the 1971 Giro d'Italia, won by Pierfranco Vianelli. At that time it became the first, and so far only, Cima Coppi to be located outside of Italy. Grossglockner was featured for a second time in 13th stage of the 2011 Giro d'Italia. It was José Rujano who arrived first, after an escape with Alberto Contador.

Winners of Grossglockner stage at the Giro d'Italia

See also

 List of highest paved roads in Europe
 List of mountain passes

References

External links
 Salzburgwiki Großglockner High Alpine Road all source literature 
 The official website of the road
 Austrian Mint 5 Euro coin featuring the road
 

Roads in Austria
Toll roads in Austria
Fusch an der Großglocknerstraße